Alexandre Azaria also known by his alias Replicant (born 3 September 1967) is a French composer, songwriter and musician. He presently signs only by his own name.

In bands
Azaria started in the 1980s as musician in bands. He was in the French rock band Le Cri de la mouche. In 1996, for a brief period, he became part of the famous French band Indochine as guitarist. He co-wrote and co-produced the album Wax for the band and left soon after in 1997.

Soundtracks
He has concentrated on composing for the soundtracks of the following films.
1998: Comme un poisson hors de l'eau by Hervé Hadmar
2002: Peau d'Ange by Vincent Perez
2003: Fanfan la Tulipe by Gérard Krawczyk
2004: Les Dalton by Philippe Haïm 
2005: Transporter 2 by Louis Leterrier 
2005: Time Jam: Valerian & Laureline (animated series) by Philippe Vidal and Eiichi Sato
2005: La vie est à nous ! by Gérard Krawczyk
2006: Astérix et les Vikings by Stefan Fjeldmark and Jesper Møller 
2007: L'Auberge rouge by Gérard Krawczyk
2008: Transporter 3 by Olivier Megaton
2008: Secret défense by Philippe Haïm
2008: 15 ans et demi by François Desagnat
2009: Le Petit Nicolas by Arnaud Bouron
2010: Imogène McCarthery by Alexandre Charlot and Franck Magnier
2011: Case départ by Lionel Steketee, Fabrice Eboué and Thomas N'Gijol
2015: The Transporter Refueled by Camille Delamarre
2016: La Dream Team by Thomas Sorriaux

References

External links

1967 births
Living people
French film score composers
French rock guitarists
French male guitarists
French male film score composers